Margherita Buy (born 15 January 1962) is an Italian actress. She is a seven-time David di Donatello Awards winner and seven-time Nastro d'argento winner.

Overview
After a long period of studying at the Academy of Dramatic Arts, she made her breakthrough role in Duccio Tessari's Una grande storia d'amore (1986), which was followed by roles in Daniele Luchetti's two projects It's Happening Tomorrow (1988) and The Week of the Sphinx (1990). For the last one, she won the best performance by an actress in a leading role award at the San Sebastian International Film Festival.

Afterwards, she played in Sergio Rubini's The Station for which she won her first David di Donatello Prize and the Silver Ribbon as best leading actress, in 1990. After The Station, she became a premier star featuring in Italian box office hits like Carlo Verdone's Damned the day I met you (1992). She teamed up again with director Daniele Luchetti for The Storm Is Coming (1992) and worked with Mario Monicelli in Looking for Paradise (1995) and Pozzessere (An Eyewitness Account).

In 1994 she was directed by her husband, Sergio Rubini, in the film Prestazione straordinaria. She also formed an association with Italian director Giuseppe Piccioni, who directed her in four films: the most important being Penniless Hearts (1996) and Not of this World, which earned Margherita her second David di Donatello Award.

Now Margherita Buy is one of the most appreciated actresses of European cinema: Ferzan Özpetek's The Ignorant Fairies, in which she portrayed a widow who discovered her husband had been having an affair with a man for the last seven years won her a Silver Ribbon as best lead. Cristina Comencini's The Best Day of My Life  won her another Silver Ribbon, this time as best supporting actress. Paolo Virzì's Caterina in the Big City won her third David and her third Silver Ribbon as best supporting actress. For her work in Giovanni Veronesi's Manuale d'amore she won her fourth David di Donatello.

Her performance in I giorni dell'abbandono by Roberto Faenza earned her the Golden Graal for best performance by an actress in a drama. Il caimano by Nanni Moretti, shown at the 2006 Cannes film festival, gave her the Ciak d'oro 2006 award as best lead actress.

In October 2006, she starred in the new release, La sconosciuta, by Academy Award winner Giuseppe Tornatore and in December she starred in Alessandro D'Alatri's Commediasexy.

Filmography

Personal life
She was born in a family with French and Tuscan origins. Her 1991 marriage with actor and film director Sergio Rubini ended by the mid-1990s. Her daughter Caterina De Angelis is an actress.

References

External links

 

1962 births
Living people
Italian film actresses
Italian people of French descent
Actresses from Rome
Accademia Nazionale di Arte Drammatica Silvio D'Amico alumni
David di Donatello winners
Nastro d'Argento winners
Ciak d'oro winners
20th-century Italian actresses
21st-century Italian actresses